Rattlesnake Mountain is a peak of the Kittatinny Mountains in Sussex County, New Jersey, United States. It lies along the Appalachian Trail in the Delaware Water Gap National Recreation Area.
Located near the junction of Mullins Rd. (unmarked) and the trail.  Rattlesnakes like any of the rocky areas of the Kittatinny Ridge, for sunning themselves.

References

External links
National Park Service: Delaware Water Gap National Recreation Area

Mountains of New Jersey
Kittatinny Mountains
Mountains of Sussex County, New Jersey